George Yammine (Arabic:  جورج يمين; Ǧōrǧ Yammīn; born in Zgharta, Lebanon on April 10, 1955 - died in Lebanon in 2000) was a Lebanese poet, media manager, and literature and arts critic in An-Nahar daily newspaper.

Earning a BA in Arabic literature, he became the director of Radio Free and United Lebanon from the years 1984 to 1987.  During this last year of 1987, he was appointed as the Director of the National Press in the North of Lebanon. He was also a member of the Association of Writers, Composers and Publishers of Music (SASEM).

George Yammine was known for writing lyrics to songs that ranged from a number of different topics, and were sung by a number of famous Lebanese artists.  Titles include:

 Oumeima El Khalil - Yā Rifāqī l-Abriyāʾ (Oh My Innocent Comrades) 
Samira Toufiq - 3a Neba3 Mar Sarkis jinna
Sammy 7awat - 3al Midan Tlaqaina
Joseph Nassif - El Ma3moura bil Koura
Wadi3 el-Safiy - El-youbil
Nour al Malla7 - Baddy B'Ailou
George Wassouf - Dally Tlejy
Ghassan Saliba - Ehden 3arouss
3azar Habib - Ehden Jammal
Majida El Roumi - Ha Ataiyna
Ragheb Aalameh - Hab Al Hawa
George Wassouf - Jayii Ana Ghanni
Ghassan Shedrawi - Jinna 3al Midan
Samir Yazbek - Kamshet etTrab
Joseph Abou Malheb - Khalf Al
Ragheb Aalameh - Layl W'taljj
Ghassan Shedrawi - Layl Wa Dabab
Asmara - Ya Layl Ehden Ya Hellou
Hayyam Younes and Joseph Abou Mrad
Saba7 - Tal El-rabei3
Hayyam Younes - Tal El-rabei3
Yola Bandali - Waraq Al Khariif (Autumn Leaves)
Joseph Abou Melheb - Ya Tiyarra

Yammine also wrote a script for a children's movie called Amani Under the Rainbow.  The lyrics to the songs in it were also written by him.

George Yammine died in the year 2000.  He was given the Lebanese Medal of Honor.

References

External links
Recordings of Yammine's music
Georges Yammine on Ehden Family Tree Website

1955 births
2000 deaths
Lebanese male poets
Lebanese Maronites
20th-century Lebanese poets
Lebanese songwriters
20th-century male writers
People from Zgharta